James Burnett or Burnet may refer to:

 James Burnett, Lord Monboddo (1714–1799), Scottish judge, scholar of linguistic evolution, philosopher and deist
 James Charles Burnett (1815–1854), surveyor and explorer in New South Wales, Australia
 Sir James Burnett, 13th Baronet (1880–1953), British Army officer
 James M. Burnet (1788–1816), Scottish painter